Jayme Fressard (born 27 June 1997) is an Australian rugby league footballer who plays as a  for the Sydney Roosters in the NRL Women's Premiership. She previously played for the Brisbane Broncos and Newcastle Knights in the NRL Women's Premiership, and the Central Coast Roosters in the NSWRL Women's Premiership.

Background
Fressard was born in Gosford and attended Gorokan High School, where she played rugby sevens. In 2015, she represented Australia in rugby sevens at the 2015 Commonwealth Youth Games in Apia.

Playing career
In 2016, Fressard played for the Berkeley Vale Panthers and was named 18th player for New South Wales. In 2017, she was again named in the New South Wales squad but did not play.

In 2018, Fressard joined CRL Newcastle in the NSWRL Women's Premiership. In June 2018, she represented NSW Country at the Women's National Championships. On 21 June 2018, she joined the Brisbane Broncos NRL Women's Premiership team. In July 2018, she ruptured her ACL and MCL, ruling her out for the 2018 NRL Women's season. 

In 2019, she broke her ankle, which saw her miss the 2019 NRL Women's season.

2020
In 2020, Fressard joined the Central Coast Roosters in the NSWRL Women's Premiership.

On 23 September, Fressard re-signed with the Broncos' NRLW team. In Round 1 of the 2020 NRL Women's season, she made her debut for the Broncos in a 28–14 win over the New Zealand Warriors.

2021
On 25 November, Fressard signed with the Newcastle Knights to be a part of their inaugural NRLW squad.

2022
In round 1 of the delayed 2021 NRL Women's season, Fressard made her club debut for the Knights against the Parramatta Eels.

In June, she signed with the Sydney Roosters for the 2022 season.

Achievements and accolades

Team
2020 NRLW Grand Final: Brisbane Broncos – Winners

References

External links
Newcastle Knights profile
Brisbane Broncos profile

1997 births
Living people
Australian female rugby league players
Rugby league centres
Brisbane Broncos (NRLW) players
Newcastle Knights (NRLW) players